Contigo (With you in Spanish and Portuguese) may refer to:

 Contigo (board game), an abstract strategy board game
 Contigo (album), a 2000 album by La Mafia
 Contigo (political party), political party in Peru
 Contigo, a manufacturer of water bottles owned by Newell Brands